Allepipona schultzeana is a species of wasp in the family Vespidae. It was described by von Schulthess in 1914.

References

Potter wasps
Insects described in 1914